Priit is an Estonian masculine given name, cognate to English Fred or Frederick and to German Friedrich.

People named Priit include:
Priit Aavik (born 1994), swimmer 
Priit Aimla (born 1941), writer, poet, humorist and politician
Priit Herodes (born 1948), heraldist
Priit Kasesalu (born 1972), programmer and software developer 
Priit Kolbre (1956–2006), diplomat
Priit Kolsar (born 1976; better known as Cool D), rapper
Priit Loog (born 1984), actor
Priit Narusk (born 1977), cross-country skier
Priit Pallum (born 1964), diplomat
Priit Pärn (born 1946), cartoonist and animation director
Priit Pedajas (born 1954), actor and theatre director
Priit Pikamäe (born 1973), lawyer and President of the Supreme Court of Estonia 
Priit Pius (born 1989), actor
Priit Pullerits (born 1965), journalist
Priit Raik (1948–2008), composer, conductor and pedagogue
Priit Salumäe, cyclist
Priit Sibul (born 1977), politician
Priit Suit (1881–1942), politician
Priit Suve (1901–1942), lawyer and politician
Priit Tasane (born 1964), rower
Priit Tender (born 1971), animated film director
Priit Tomson (born 1942), basketball player
Priit Toobal (born 1983), politician 
Priit Vesilind (born 1943), writer and photojournalist
Priit Viks (born 1982), biathlete
Priit Vilba (born 1953), politician and businessman
Priit Võigemast (born 1980), actor
Priit Volmer (born 1978), opera singer

References

Estonian masculine given names